"Aún Hay Algo" (English: "There's Still Something") is the second single released from RBD's second studio album Nuestro Amor (2005). The song went to number 1 in Mexico in December 2005. It promoted the soap opera's second season.

It has a Portuguese version called "Venha de Novo O Amor" (May Love Return), which was released in Brazil as a single. Later, Brazil would have the acoustic version of "Aun Hay Algo", taken from Live in Hollywood, released as a single to promote the album in that country (the official single from "Live in Hollywood" everywhere else was "No Pares").

Chart performance
The song went to number thirty-six on Billboard's Hot Latin Tracks, becoming 'Hot Shot Debut' in early March 2006. The song later peaked at number twenty-four in April 2006.

Music video
The music video for "Aún Hay Algo" was directed by Pedro Damián, making it the fourth directing job by Damián for a RBD video. Even though the video premiered in November 2005, it still enjoyed a remarkable success during the first 3 months of 2006.
 
The video is mainly about what every member of RBD does before performing in one of their concerts. It features the band experiencing surreal journeys through different parts of a theater. Lastly, the video shows footage of what an actual RBD concert looks like.

Release history

Awards

Charts

References

2005 singles
2006 singles
RBD songs
Spanish-language songs
Songs written by Carlos Lara (songwriter)
EMI Records singles